A Roma Special School is a school for Roma children. They are often associated with schools for mentally or physically disabled children, and are generally considered to put Roma students at a disadvantage by delivering lower-quality education than traditional schools. Special Schools are sometimes preferred by Roma parents because children are better-protected from discrimination from non-Roma students.

References 

Special schools
Romani-related controversies
Education in Slovakia
Education in Hungary
Romani in Hungary
Romani in Slovakia